David Matthew Sandner (born 1966) is an author and editor of fantasy literature and a professor at California State University, Fullerton.

Education and career
Sandner has a master's degree from San Francisco State University and a doctorate from the University of Oregon.  His doctoral thesis was titled The Fairy Way of Writing: Fantastic literature from the romance revival to Romanticism, 1712–1830, and was completed in 2000. He is a professor in the Department of English, Comparative Literature, and Linguistics at California State University, Fullerton.

Books
Sandner's books include:

Fiction
Mingus Fingers (with Jacob Weisman, Fairwood, 2019)<ref>Reviews of Mingus Fingers: Paul Di Filippo, Locus, ; Publishers Weekly, </ref>

Non-fictionThe Fantastic Sublime: Romanticism and Transcendence in Nineteenth-century Children's Fantasy Literature (Greenwood, 1996)Critical Discourses of the Fantastic, 1712–1831 (Ashgate, 2011), a two time Mythopoeic Awards finalist

As editorFantastic Literature: A Critical Reader (Praeger, 2004)The Treasury of the Fantastic (with Jacob Weisman, Tachyon Publications, 2013)Philip K. Dick: Essays of the Here and Now'' (McFarland, 2020)

References

External links

American fantasy writers
American short story writers
Living people
San Francisco State University alumni
University of Oregon alumni
California State University, Fullerton faculty
American male poets
American male novelists
American male short story writers
Novelists from California
1966 births